Big Sandy is a town in Benton County, Tennessee, United States. The population was 557 at the 2010 census.

Geography
Big Sandy is located at  (36.234203, -88.085869).

Big Sandy is concentrated around the intersection of State Route 69A and State Route 147.

Climate

Demographics

As of the census of 2000, there were 518 people, 241 households, and 145 families residing in the town. The population density was 728.0 people per square mile (281.7/km2). There were 298 housing units at an average density of 418.8 per square mile (162.1/km2). The racial makeup of the town was 99.23% White, 0.19% from other races, and 0.58% from two or more races. Hispanic or Latino of any race were 0.19% of the population.

There were 241 households, out of which 22.0% had children under the age of 18 living with them, 44.4% were married couples living together, 11.6% had a female householder with no husband present, and 39.8% were non-families. 36.9% of all households were made up of individuals, and 19.1% had someone living alone who was 65 years of age or older. The average household size was 2.15 and the average family size was 2.79.

In the town, the population age spread was 21.0% under the age of 18, 7.1% from 18 to 24, 23.6% from 25 to 44, 27.6% from 45 to 64, and 20.7% who were 65 years of age or older. The median age was 44 years. For every 100 females, there were 91.1 males. For every 100 females age 18 and over, there were 87.6 males.

The median income for a household in the town was $22,917, and the median income for a family was $26,354. Males had a median income of $23,125 versus $17,596 for females. The per capita income for the town was $13,688. About 13.8% of families and 21.0% of the population were below the poverty line, including 43.9% of those under age 18 and 13.2% of those age 65 or over.

References

External links
Official site
Town charter
On The Ball Magazine - Big Sandy Red Devils Sports

Towns in Benton County, Tennessee
Towns in Tennessee